Musalı (also, Musaly, Agarent, and Massaly) is a village and municipality in the Saatly Rayon of Azerbaijan.  It has a population of 879.

References 

Populated places in Saatly District